Al Ittihad Gheryan is a Libyan football club based in Gharyan in western Libya, south of Tripoli. The club currently plays in the Libyan Second Division (2008–09), having been promoted from the Libyan Third Division the season before. The club plays its home games at the GMR Stadium.

The club did have a season in the top flight (1994–95).

References

Football clubs in Libya